Stephen Barker Turner (born June 27, 1968) is an American stage, television, and film actor.

Career
Turner was born in St. Louis, Missouri on June 27, 1968. He is a Juilliard Drama School graduate. After starring in numerous stage productions, he made his film debut in Book of Shadows: Blair Witch 2. He had a small but important nonspeaking role in Cosmopolitan (2003). He has also appeared in the television shows Swift Justice, Sex and the City, Law & Order, and Law & Order: Special Victims Unit.

He played title role of Charlie in Seducing Charlie Barker, an independent film adaptation of Theresa Rebeck's stage play The Scene, released in December 2011.

He is an Associate Artist at the California Shakespeare Theater, where he appeared as the titular character in their 2005 production of The Life and Adventures of Nicholas Nickleby.

Filmography

Film
 Machiavelli Rises (2000)
 Book of Shadows: Blair Witch 2 (2000)
 The Disappearance of Andy Waxman (2004) as Andy
 Satellite (2006) as Matt Muttel
 The Warrior Class (2007) as Whitman Poole
 We Pedal Uphill (2008) as Oliver
 Human Resources (2009)
 Seducing Charlie Barker (2010) as  Charlie

Television
 Swift Justice (1 episode, 1996) as Bud Wertheim
 Sex and the City (1 episode, 1999) as Jeremy Fields
 Law & Order (1 episode, 1999) as Nick Vance
 Law & Order: Special Victims Unit (1 episode, 2000) as Steven Hale
 Cosmopolitan (2003) as Hans
 Hack (1 episode, 2004) as Mitchell Patton
 Independent Lens (1 episode, 2004) as Hans
 Law & Order: Criminal Intent (1 episode, 2005) as Adam Riggins
 Blue Bloods (1 episode, 2011) as Richard Hansen
 Body of Proof — Tom Parker — Episode: Missing

References

External links

1968 births
American male film actors
Living people
Male actors from St. Louis